BREN (Bulgarian Research and Education Network) is both the name of the Bulgarian National research and education network as well as the name of the Association that plans, deploys and maintains it.

BREN provides high-speed network that interconnects Bulgarian universities and other research and educational institutions in Bulgaria.

BREN network is connected to the pan-European research and education network GEANT via 1Gbit link.

BREN participates in international projects like 6Deploy, GEANT2, GEANT3
and is a member of TERENA, CEENet

References

See also
 National research and education network
 GEANT
 GEANT2
 DANTE (pan-European research network)
 TERENA

Internet in Bulgaria
National research and education networks